Riccardo Improta (born 19 December 1993) is an Italian professional footballer who plays as a forward for Benevento.

His elder brothers Umberto and Giancarlo Improta are also professional footballers.

Club career
Born in Pozzuoli, The Province of Naples, Campania, Riccardo Improta started his career at hometown club Puteolana. He was the member of Giovanissimi U15 team in 2007–08 season. In 2008–09 season he was the member of Allievi Fascia B U16 team. In 2009–10 season Improta promoted to Allievi U17 team. All 3 teams competed in Campania regional youth league.

In 2010 Improta left for the reserve of Lega Pro Prima Divisione team Lanciano.

Lanciano
On 2 May 2011, Improta made his first team debut against Lucchese. Riccardo replaced Alessandro Volpe at half-time, while his brother, Umberto Improta was replaced by Mario Titone. He was promoted to the first team in the 2011–12 Lega Pro Prima Divisione season, while Umberto left the club. Improta made a total of 10 appearances, seven of which were starts. On 18 January 2012, he left for Serie A club Genoa in a temporary deal.

Genoa
Improta played for the Genoa reserve team in the Campionato Nazionale Primavera. He played 9 games and scored 1 goal in the second half of the 2011–12 season. He also played in the first round of the play-offs, losing to Fiorentina.

On 22 June 2012, Genoa excised the option to sign Improta outright, for €150,000. He left for Gubbio's pre-season camp. However, he was allowed to join Juve Stabia on 4 August 2012.

On 2 July 2013, Improta left for Chievo on loan, with an option to buy. In January 2014, Chievo bought him in a co-ownership deal for a peppercorn of €500. However, he left for Padova immediately.

In June 2014, Improta returned to Genoa for an undisclosed fee.

On 1 September 2014, Improta left for Bologna.

On 18 July 2015, Improta was signed by Cesena on a temporary basis. On 19 August 2016, Improta left for Salernitana in another loan. Before he left Genoa, he was assigned the number 16 shirt.

On 11 July 2017, Improta was signed by Bari.

On 1 July 2018, Improta signed for Serie B club Benevento.

International career
Improta was capped for Italy national under-19 football team in the second half of the 2011–12 season. He scored twice in 3 games of 2012 UEFA European Under-19 Football Championship elite qualification. Along with Francesco Zampano, they scored a goal against U19 team when they represented Italy Lega Pro representative teams in December 2011. After the game they both entered U19 team.

Career statistics

Honours

Club
Lanciano (youth)
 Campionato Nazionale Dante Berretti Runner-up: 2011

Individual
Genoa (youth)
 Top-scorer of 2012 Torneo di Viareggio

References

External links
 FIGC 
 Football.it Profile 
 

1993 births
Living people
Italian footballers
Italy under-21 international footballers
Italy youth international footballers
Serie A players
Serie B players
Serie C players
S.S. Virtus Lanciano 1924 players
Genoa C.F.C. players
S.S. Juve Stabia players
A.C. ChievoVerona players
Calcio Padova players
Bologna F.C. 1909 players
A.C. Cesena players
S.S.C. Bari players
Benevento Calcio players
Association football forwards
People from Pozzuoli
Footballers from Campania